The 2011 Royal Trophy was the fifth edition of the Royal Trophy, a team golf event contested between teams representing Asia and Europe. It was held from  7–9 January at the Black Mountain Golf Club in Thailand. Europe won the Trophy 9 to 7.

Teams

Schedule
7 January (Friday) Foursomes x 4
8 January (Saturday) Four-ball x 4
9 January (Sunday) Singles x 8

Friday's matches (Foursomes)

Saturday's matches (Four-ball)

Sunday's matches (Singles)

References

External links
Official site

Royal Trophy
Golf tournaments in Thailand
Royal Trophy
Royal Trophy
Royal Trophy